Trioxidonitrogen(•) or nitrate radical is an oxide of nitrogen with formula , consisting of three oxygen atoms covalently bound to a nitrogen atom.  This highly unstable blue compound has not been isolated in pure form, but can be generated and observed as a short-lived component of gas, liquid, or solid systems.

Like nitrogen dioxide , it is a radical (a molecule with an unpaired valence electron), which makes it paramagnetic.  It is the uncharged counterpart of the nitrate anion  and an isomer of the peroxynitrite radical .

Nitrogen trioxide is an important intermediate in reactions between atmospheric components, including the destruction of ozone.

History
The existence of the  radical was postulated in 1881-1882 by Hautefeuille and Chappuis to explain the absorption spectrum of air subjected to a silent electrical discharge.

Structure and properties
The neutral  molecule appears to be planar, with three-fold rotational symmetry (symmetry group D3h); or possibly a resonance between three Y-shaped molecules.

The  radical does not react directly with water, and is relatively unreactive towards closed-shell molecules, as opposed to isolated atoms and other radicals.  It is decomposed by light of certain wavelengths into nitric oxide  and oxygen .

The absorption spectrum of  has a broad band for light with wavelengths from about 500 to 680 nm, with three salient peaks in the visible at 590, 662, and 623 nm.  Absorption in the range 640–680 nm does not lead to dissociation but to fluorescence: specifically, from about 605 to 800 nm following excitation at 604.4 nm, and from about 662 to 800 nm following excitation at 661.8 nm.  In water solution, another absorption band appears at about 330 nm (ultraviolet).  An excited state  can be achieved by photons of wavelength less than 595 nm.

Preparation
Nitrogen trioxide can be prepared in the gas phase by mixing nitrogen dioxide and ozone:
  +  →  + 
This reaction can be performed also in the solid phase or water solutions, by irradiating frozen gas mixtures, flash photolysis and radiolysis of nitrate salts and nitric acid, and several other methods.

Nitrogen trioxide is a product of the photolysis of dinitrogen pentoxide , chlorine nitrate , and peroxynitric acid  and its salts.

N2O5 → NO2 + NO3

2 ClONO2 → Cl2 + 2 NO3

References

Nitrogen oxides
Free radicals